Zard Kamar may refer to:
 Zard Kamar, Kurdistan
 Zard Kamar, Mazandaran